Derek Morgan may refer to:

 Derek Morgan, fictional character from the comic book Ultimate Comics: X
 Derek Morgan (cricketer) (1929−2017), English cricketer
 Derek Morgan (Criminal Minds), fictional character

See also
 Derrick Morgan (born 1940), musical artist
 Derrick Morgan (American football) (born 1989), American football defensive end